There are at least 238 waterfalls in the U.S. state of Oregon.

See also 
 Lists of Oregon-related topics

Oregon
Waterfalls